Shepstone may refer to:

Place 
Port Shepstone, town of South Africa

People
Denis Gem Shepstone (1888–1966), South African politician
George Shepstone (1876–1940), South African cricketer
Mike Shepstone (born in 1943), English drummer of The Rokes band
Paul Shepstone (born in 1970), English professional footballer
Theophilus Shepstone (1817–1893), British South African statesman